Rishra Railway station is a  railway station in Howrah–Bardhaman main line located in the Hooghly district, West Bengal. It serves the town of Rishra and southern part of Serampore town.

References 

Eastern Railway zone
Railway stations in West Bengal
Kolkata Suburban Railway stations